"Rowla" is the title of a promotional 1996 single release and a song  by Underworld, from their album Second Toughest in the Infants. The song is the final version of "Cherry Pie" from the "Pearl's Girl" single.

Track listing
Promo single
 "Rowla" – 6:31
 "Juanita" – 16:36

Appearances 
 "Rowla" appears on Second Toughest in the Infants.

External links
Underworld discography pages at dirty.org
Underworldlive.com

Underworld (band) songs
1996 singles
1996 songs
Songs written by Darren Emerson
Wax Trax! Records singles
Songs written by Rick Smith (musician)
Songs written by Karl Hyde